2001 Einstein is a bright Hungaria asteroid from the innermost region of the asteroid belt. It was discovered by Swiss astronomer Paul Wild at Zimmerwald Observatory near Bern, Switzerland, on 5 March 1973. It is named after physicist Albert Einstein (1879–1955).

Orbit and classification 

Einstein is a member of the Hungaria family, which form the innermost dense concentration of asteroids in the Solar System. It orbits the Sun in the inner main-belt at a distance of 1.7–2.1 AU once every 2 years and 8 months (982 days). Its orbit has an eccentricity of 0.10 and an inclination of 23° with respect to the ecliptic. As no precoveries were taken, the asteroid's observation arc begins with its discovery in 1973.

Naming 

This minor planet was named in honour of the German-born, Swiss–American physicist and Nobelist Albert Einstein (1879–1955). It is considered suitable, that the body discovered at Bern is named after the 1921 Nobel prize for physics laureate, since it was the place where he had his golden years while working as a clerk at the Swiss Patent Office in Bern. He is also honored by the lunar crater Einstein. The official  was published by the Minor Planet Center on 15 October 1977. Arthur C. Clarke joked in the postscript of his novel 3001: The Final Odyssey that he was hoping asteroid 2001 would be named after him, but it was named for Einstein first. Asteroid 3001 was named 3001 Michelangelo. Clarke was later honoured with asteroid 4923 Clarke, named together with 5020 Asimov.

Physical characteristics 

The Tholen classification, Einstein is an X-type asteroid, while in the SMASS classification, it is an Xe-subtype which transitions from the X-type to the very bright E-type asteroid.

Rotation period 

Several rotational lightcurves for this asteroid were obtained from photometric observations. Between 2008 and 2012, three additional lightcurves at the PDS gave an almost identical period of 5.485 hours with an amplitude of 0.67, 0.74 and 1.02, respectively. Other lightcurves were obtained by Hanuš at the French CNES and other institutions, which gave a period of  hours, and by Italian astronomer Federico Manzini at SAS observatory in Novara, Jean Strajnic and Raoul Behrend from December 2012, which rendered a period of  hours with an amplitude of 0.66 in magnitude.

Diameter and albedo 

According to the survey carried out by the NEOWISE mission of NASA's space-based Wide-field Infrared Survey Explorer (WISE), the asteroid measures 4.0 km in diameter and its surface has an exceptionally high albedo of 0.81, for which WISE assigns an E-type. The Collaborative Asteroid Lightcurve Link assumes a lower, yet still high albedo of 0.40 and hence calculates a larger diameter of 5.7 kilometers, as the lower the albedo, the larger the body's diameter for a constant absolute magnitude.

References

External links 
  
 Lightcurve plot of 2001 Einstein, Palmer Divide Observatory, B. D. Warner (2012)
 Lightcurve Database Query (LCDB), at www.minorplanet.info
 Dictionary of Minor Planet Names, Google books
 Asteroids and comets rotation curves, CdR – Geneva Observatory, Raoul Behrend
 Discovery Circumstances: Numbered Minor Planets (1)-(5000) – Minor Planet Center
 
 

002001
Discoveries by Paul Wild (Swiss astronomer)
Named minor planets
2001
002001
002001
19730305